Manju Shiwach is an Indian politician and a member of the 17th Legislative Assembly of Uttar Pradesh of India. She represents the Modinagar constituency of Uttar Pradesh and is a member of the Bharatiya Janata Party. She is a gynaecologist.

References 

Bharatiya Janata Party politicians from Uttar Pradesh
People from Modinagar
Living people
Year of birth missing (living people)
Uttar Pradesh MLAs 2017–2022
Uttar Pradesh MLAs 2022–2027